Rubush & Hunter was an architectural firm in Indianapolis, Indiana in the United States. Established in 1905 by architects Preston C. Rubush and Edgar O. Hunter, Rubush & Hunter operated until 1939.

Firm history
Preston C. Rubush and Edgar O. Hunter formed their partnership in 1905. Previously, Rubush had been a member of the firms of Scharn & Rubush and P. C. Rubush & Company. Rubush and Hunter maintained their partnership until 1939, when both retired. In 1940 the firm was taken over by Philip A. Weisenburgh, chief draftsman and designer of the firm. Weisenburgh retired in 1969.

Partners

Preston C. Rubush
Preston C. Rubush was born March 30, 1867, in Oakford, Indiana, to William G. and Marie E. (Wyrick) Rubush. His father was a general contractor. He attended public schools and completed a special course in architecture at the University of Illinois. He initially found employment in the Peoria, Illinois, branch office of architect James F. Alexander, based in Lafayette, Indiana. He worked for Alexander for two years, and then for others until 1893. In that year he came to Indianapolis and formed a partnership, Scharn & Rubush, with John H. Scharn. In 1900, Scharn retired, and Rubush continued the business as P. C. Rubush & Company. In 1905, he formed his partnership with Hunter. They remained together until they retired in 1939.

In 1898, Rubush married Renah J. Wilcox of Nebraska. Rubush died February 4, 1947, at his winter home in Miami Beach, Florida. He was survived by his wife and other family members, but no children.

Edgar O. Hunter
Edgar Otis Hunter was born in 1873 in Versailles, Indiana. He attended public schools in Indianapolis and the University of Pennsylvania. Upon his return to Indianapolis he worked for Vonnegut & Bohn before joining Rubush. He became partner in the firm in 1905, and like Rubush retired in 1939.

In 1899, Hunter married Anna Blanche Lee. He died in Miami Beach, Florida, on November 20, 1949.

Hunter's brother, Frank B. Hunter, was also an architect in Indianapolis.

Philip A. Weisenburgh
Philip Arthur Weisenburgh was born in 1887 in Frankfort, Kentucky. When he joined Rubush & Hunter is unknown, but he was chief draftsman by 1925. He succeeded to the practice when Rubush and Hunter retired in 1939, He himself retired in 1969. He died in Indianapolis November 12, 1972.

His wife was Louise Weisenburgh, with whom he had a daughter. He was a member of the American Institute of Architects from 1942 until his death.

Legacy
Many of the firm's buildings in Indianapolis have been listed on the United States National Register of Historic Places, and others contribute to listed historic districts.

In addition to their work in Indiana, the firm was hired by Indianapolis developers Carl G. Fisher and Joseph Wesley Young Jr. to do extensive work at their Florida resorts, Miami Beach and Hollywood, respectively. Several of their Hollywood buildings survive, and Rubush and Hunter would both own second homes in Miami Beach.

Architectural works

References

Architecture firms based in Indianapolis